Bayezid Osman, also known as Osman Bayezid Osmanoğlu with a surname as required by the Republic of Turkey, or known by the Ottoman imperial name as Şehzade (Prince) Bayezid Osman Efendi (23 June 1924 – 6 January 2017), was the 44th Head of the Imperial House of Osman, which ruled the Ottoman Empire from 1299 to 1922. The monarchy was abolished in 1922, with the modern Republic of Turkey replacing it.

Biography
He was the second son of Sultan Abdulmejid I's grandson Ibrahim Tevfik (24 September 1874 – 31 December 1931) by his fourth consort Şadiye Hanım. He was a member of one of the younger branches of the House of Osman. He was the first member of the House of Osman to be born in exile, and the first head to have been born after the dissolution of the Ottoman Empire.

He served in the US military and worked as a librarian. He lived in USA and France. He was known as a quiet and fun person, always available towards relatives and a lover of Turkish cuisine. 

He declared that he had no grudges towards the regime that exiled his family and that for a long time prevented him from even visiting Turkey, saying he was happy to have at least been conceived in his homeland. His only bitterness concerned the 24-hour limit given to exiled members to leave the country, which forced them to leave without material assets and later determined their precarious economic situation.

Osman never married and had no children. On 23 September 2009 with the death of Ertuğrul Osman, he succeeded to the head of the House of Osman. Osman's relative, Abdulhamid Kayıhan Osmanoğlu, announced on social media that Osman had died in New York on 6 January 2017, aged ninety-two.

Ancestry

See also
 Line of succession to the former Ottoman throne

References

External links

1924 births
2017 deaths
Nobility from Paris
French expatriates in the United States
Heads of the Osmanoğlu family